Italy and Scotland have played each other at rugby union in 35 matches, with Scotland winning 27 times, Italy winning 8 times and no matches drawn.

Their most recent encounter in March 2023 was won 26-14 by Scotland.

The two nations compete for the Cuttitta Cup, an annual trophy contested during the Six Nations to commemorate Massimo Cuttitta, a former Italian captain and Scotland scrum coach.

Summary

Overall

Records
Note: Date shown in brackets indicates when the record was or last set.

Results

References

Italy national rugby union team matches
Scotland national rugby union team matches
Six Nations Championship
Rugby union rivalries in Italy
Rugby union rivalries in Scotland